is a train station in Nakagyo-ku, Kyoto, Japan.

Lines
West Japan Railway Company (JR West)
Sagano Line (Sanin Main Line)

Layout
The elevated station has an island platform with two tracks.

History

Station numbering was introduced in March 2018 with Emmachi being assigned station number JR-E05.

References

Railway stations in Kyoto Prefecture
Railway stations in Japan opened in 2000
Railway stations in Kyoto
Sanin Main Line